Chiran (also Romanized as Chīrān) is a village in Rud Pish Rural District, in the Central District of Fuman County, Gilan Province, Iran. At the 2006 census, its population was 1,204, in 283 families.

References 

Populated places in Fuman County